Mouser Electronics is a global distributor of semiconductors and electronic components. With over $4 billion in annual revenue, Mouser is ranked as the seventh largest electronic component distributor in the world. The company has 27 locations globally and more than 3,700 employees. Mouser is part of the Berkshire Hathaway family of companies.

The company’s global headquarters and distribution center rests on a large 100-acre campus in the DFW Metroplex, Texas. Facilities span one million square feet to accommodate inventory for over a million unique SKUs consisting of new products and technologies from over 1,200 manufacturer brands, including Texas Instruments, Intel, TE Connectivity and Analog Devices.

Mouser’s global distribution center is active 24 hours a day to manage tens of thousands of orders each day. Distribution center staff processes and ships to over 650,000 customers in over 223 countries and/or territories.

Mouser has made capital investments in 120 Vertical Lift Modules, which is the largest installation in North America.

E-commerce 
The website has products from 1,200 manufacturer brands and access to 6.8 million products and data sheets. It has a project manager with automatic re-order and Bill Of Materials (BOM) import capabilities. Users can subscribe to a Mouser newsletter, and microsites from the Mouser.com website teach about new technologies.

Also available on the website are a variety of resources and tools for electronic design engineers and buyers, such as inventory management and price and availability tools, as well as conversion calculators.

History
Mouser Electronics was founded in El Cajon, California by Jerry Mouser in 1964.

In 1986, his company relocated to its corporate headquarters to Mansfield, Texas, and expanded into a new facility.  In January 2000, Mouser became a wholly owned subsidiary of TTI, Inc. in Fort Worth, Texas. In December 2006, a majority ownership of TTI was sold to Warren Buffett-controlled Berkshire Hathaway. In 2007, the company expanded its warehouse and office space by 231,800 square feet.

In 2008, the company opened an international office in Shanghai, and continued to expand globally opening customer service and technical support branches worldwide, reaching a total of 27 total offices in 2019. Branch locations include Brazil, Canada, Mexico, Hong Kong, Shanghai, India, Japan, Korea, Malaysia, Philippines, Singapore, Taiwan, Thailand, Vietnam, Israel, Germany, United Kingdom, France, Italy, Netherlands, Spain, Sweden, Poland and Czech Republic.

In 2013, Mouser cosponsored the SAE Counterfeit parts Avoidance Symposium in Canada. In 2018, Mouser became the first electronic component distributor to receive accreditation for AC7403 from the Counterfeit Avoidance Accreditation Program (CAAP). Through the accreditation to AC7403, Mouser demonstrates compliance with the AS6496 Aerospace Standard.

The company has been presented awards such as "Electronics Choice Industry Award for Community Activism - Social or Educational Cause" from the Electronic Components Industry Association in 2013 and from connector manufacturer Harting in 2013 for "New Customer Growth" and "New Product Growth". Mouser was named Molex “eCatalog Distributor of the Year” globally and in the Americas, Europe and Asia in 2020.

In 2018, Mouser reported sales of $1.9 billion (US$).

The company completed another expansion of the corporate headquarters and global distribution center in early 2020.

References

Electronic component distributors
Industrial supply companies
Distribution companies of the United States
Companies based in the Dallas–Fort Worth metroplex
Mansfield, Texas
American companies established in 1964
Business services companies established in 1964
2000 mergers and acquisitions
Berkshire Hathaway
1964 establishments in California